Daniel Grou (born August 19, 1967), frequently credited as Podz, is a Canadian film and television director. His credits include the films 10½, L'Affaire Dumont, 7 Days (Les 7 jours du Talion), Miraculum, King Dave and Mafia Inc. as well as episodes of the television series Drop the Beat, The Hunger, Big Wolf on Campus, Vampire High, Les Bougon, Minuit, le soir, 19-2, Vikings, Cardinal and Au nom de la loi.

He took the nickname "Podz" from the fact that his surname differs in spelling, but not in pronunciation, from the far more common French Canadian surname Groulx, meaning that he was frequently forced to state his surname to people as "Grou, pas d'lx".

He is a four-time Gémeaux Award winner for Best Direction in a Dramatic Television Series or Program, winning in 2003 for the television film Exils, in 2006 and 2007 for Minuit, le soir, and in 2011 for the French version of 19-2. He was a Jutra Award nominee for Best Director in 2011 for 10½ and in 2013 for L'Affaire Dumont, a Genie Award nominee for Best Director at the 31st Genie Awards in 2010 for 10½, and a Canadian Screen Award nominee for Best Direction in a Dramatic Television Series at the 4th Canadian Screen Awards in 2016 for the 19-2 episode "School". Grou is represented by Omada Agency in Montreal.

References

External links

1967 births
Canadian television directors
Film directors from Quebec
French Quebecers
Living people
Place of birth missing (living people)